Best is the second greatest hits album by Japanese singer Akina Nakamori,  released on April 1, 1986 by Warner Pioneer.

Background
It contains all the singles released between 1982 and 1985: from the "Slow Motion" to "Solitude".

The singles "Sand Beige (Sabaku e)" and "Solitude" were recorded in the album for first time. Although "Meu amor é..."  was included in the studio album D404ME, the original version was recorded for first time as well.

Promotion

Singles
Sand Beige (Sabaku e) is the twelfth single released on 16 June 1985. It's her second A-side song with the far east rhythm instrumentation. The small part of the refrain performed in the Egyptian dialect. The single debuted at number 1 on Oricon Single Weekly Chart and became the seventh best sold single in 1985. In the Best Ten ranking, it debuted on number 2 and stayed at number 8 in the yearly chart.

It has received three awards: award in the 11th Nihon TV Ongakusai, in the 18th Japan Cable Awards and in the 18th Zennihon Yuusen Housou Taishou.

Solitude is the thirteenth single released on 9 October 1985. The single debuted at number 1 on Oricon Single Weekly Chart and became the 35th best sold single in 1985. In the Best Ten ranking, it debuted on number 2 and stayed at number 29 in the yearly chart.

It has received three awards: Yokohama Music Festival Award at the Yokohama Music Festival, Gold Award and Best Singing Award in the Zen Nihon Kayou Ongakusai and Broadcast Music Producer Federation Award in the 16th Japan Music Awards.

Charting performance
The album debuted at number 1 on the Oricon Weekly Album Charts and remained in the same position for three consecutive weeks. LP Record version charted 23 weeks, Cassette tape charted 96 weeks and CD version charted 62 weeks. The album remained at number 6 on the Oricon Album Yearly Charts in 1986. The album totally sold more than 770,000 copies. It won the Grand Prix Album of the Year and the Best Album of the Year – Pop (Solo) at the 1st Japan Gold Disc Awards.

Track listing

References

1986 compilation albums
Akina Nakamori compilation albums
Japanese-language compilation albums
Warner Music Japan compilation albums